Hieronymus David Gaubius (24 February 1705 – 29 November 1780) was a German physician and chemist.

Life

He was a native of Heidelberg. He studied medicine and sciences at the Universities of Harderwijk and Leiden, where he was a pupil of Hermann Boerhaave (1668–1738) and Bernhard Siegfried Albinus (1697–1770). He earned his degree at Leiden in 1725 with a thesis on psychosomatic medicine called . After graduation he continued his training in Paris, and then practiced medicine in Amsterdam and Deventer.

In 1731 Gaubius was invited to Leiden by Boerhaave as a lecturer in chemistry, and in 1734 he became a full professor of medicine and chemistry. Gaubius isolated menthol in 1771.

He was elected a Fellow of the Royal Society in 1764.

Works
One of his best known works was Institutiones Pathologiae medicinalis, a 1758 textbook on systematic pathology that remained popular for many years.

References 

 "This article is based on a translation of an equivalent article at the Dutch Wikipedia".

External links 
 
 

1705 births
1780 deaths
Scientists from Heidelberg
University of Harderwijk alumni
Leiden University alumni
Academic staff of Leiden University
18th-century German physicians
18th-century German chemists
Fellows of the Royal Society
Physicians from Heidelberg